Talu (他鲁; also known as Taliu) is a Loloish language spoken by just over 10,000 speakers in Yongsheng and Huaping counties (Zhou 2004:1). Zhou (2004) focuses on the Talu dialect of Liude Township 六德乡. Bradley (2004) reports that Talu is spoken in Yongsheng, Ninglang and Huaping counties by 10,138 people, mainly in 4 villages of Liude Township 六德乡 in northeastern Yongsheng County. There are also Talu speakers in adjacent parts of Ninglangping Township, southern Ninglang County, and Tongda Township 通达傈僳族乡 in northeastern Huaping County. Talu has voiceless nasals as also the voiceless lateral. It is related to Lolopo.

A closely related language variety called Nazan 纳咱 is spoken in Nazan Village 纳咱, Liude Village 六德村, Liude Township 六德乡, Yongsheng County (Yongsheng County Gazetteer 1989:637). It is also spoken in 2 villages in Liude Township, and a few in Banqiao Township.

References

Duan Qiuhong [段秋红]. 2015. A study of Taliu vocabulary [他留语词汇调查研究]. M.A. dissertation. Kunming: Yunnan Normal University.
Zhou Decai [周德才]. 2004. A study of the Taliu language [他留话研究]. Kunming: Yunnan People's Press [云南民族出版社].

Loloish languages
Languages of China